USS Norfolk may refer to:

 was a brig during the Quasi-War with France
Norfolk (CL-118) was a light cruiser renamed Chattanooga prior to construction
Norfolk (CA-137) was a heavy cruiser laid down in December 1944 at the Philadelphia Naval Shipyard, but construction was cancelled in August 1945
 was a destroyer leader/frigate in service from 1953 to 1970
 is a  commissioned in 1983 and decommissioned in 2014.

See also
 

United States Navy ship names